The Scrappin' Kid is a 1926 American silent Western film directed by Clifford Smith and starring Art Acord, Velma Connor, and Jimmy Boudwin.

Plot
As described in a review in a film magazine, Bill Bradley (Acord) appears as a chap who lives along on a little ranch. During a forest fire he saves a young woman and her small brother and sister. Mail bandits have robbed a train hide in the hills, and finally venture forth and make Bill a prisoner. He escapes and sends his dog to the sheriff. The bandits capture the woman and take her to their lair. Bill pursues and fights them, and the sheriff appears and takes them into custody. Bill wins the affection of the young woman and uses the government reward from the capture of the gang to pay off the mortgage on his ranch.

Cast

References

Bibliography
 Munden, Kenneth White. The American Film Institute Catalog of Motion Pictures Produced in the United States, Part 1. University of California Press, 1997.

External links
 

1926 films
1926 Western (genre) films
Universal Pictures films
Films directed by Clifford Smith
American black-and-white films
Silent American Western (genre) films
1920s English-language films
1920s American films
Films with screenplays by Richard Schayer